Sir George Samuel Measom (3 December 1818 – 1 March 1901) was a British engraver and publisher who compiled guides to railway travel in Great Britain in the mid-19th century. In later life he became involved in charitable works, and was knighted in 1891.

Biography
Measom was born in Blackheath, Kent, the son of Daniel Measom, a carver and gilder.

In 1842, he married Sarah Hillman. During the 1840s, he developed his skills as an engraver and in 1849 published The Bible: its Elevating Influence on Man, a moral tale in illustrated form. From the 1850s onwards much of Measom's work related to descriptions of railways; first railway work was the 1852 Illustrated Guide to the Great Western Railway. His railway works described the railways from the practical standpoint of a traveller, and all publications after the first took a title of the form  The Official Illustrated Guide to ... . By 1867 his book covered the entire British network.

Sarah died in 1867, after which he remarried to Charlotte Simpson.

From the 1880s, Measom became involved in charity work, he was treasurer of the Royal Society for the Prevention of Cruelty to Animals, and promoted a related work that later became the Battersea Dogs' Home, and supported the Royal Marsden hospital.

He was knighted in 1891, for his public work. George Measom died on 1 March 1901 at home, Isleworth, Middlesex. He left no children.

Works

See also
 George Bradshaw, publisher of railway timetables and guides.

References

Sources

External links

 Cover image, Great Western Railway, 1860

1818 births
1901 deaths
English travel writers
Knights Bachelor
19th-century English non-fiction writers